Kadell Ebony Daniel (born 3 June 1994) is a professional footballer who plays as a midfielder for Isthmian Premier Division side Horsham. Born in England, he represents the Guyana national team at international level.

Club career
Daniel started his career with local side Crystal Palace and appeared as an unused substitute in an FA Cup tie in January 2012, against Derby County, in which Palace lost 1–0, courtesy of a goal by Theo Robinson. On 4 September 2013, after rejecting a new deal at Crystal Palace, Daniel joined Championship side Charlton Athletic on a one-year deal, with an option of an extra year.

After failing to make an impression within his first two years at the club, Daniel was sent out on loan to Hayes & Yeading United on a one-month loan in February 2015. On 14 February 2015, Daniel made his Hayes & Yeading United debut in a 1–1 draw against Bromley, featuring for 83 minutes before being replaced by Rhys Murrell-Williamson. On 26 March 2015, Daniel joined Conference Premier side Torquay United on loan for the remainder of the 2014–15 campaign. On 4 April 2015, Daniel made his Torquay United debut in a 1–1 draw against Dartford, starting the game before being replaced by Duane Ofori-Acheampong in the 83rd minute. A week later, Daniel scored his first Torquay United goal in a 2–0 home victory over Altrincham, opening the scoring in the 22nd minute. Daniel went onto score once more for Torquay before returning to Charlton at the end of the season.

In August 2015, preceding his release from Charlton, Daniel joined National League side Woking on a one-year deal. On 8 August 2015, Daniel made his Woking debut in a 1–0 away defeat against Tranmere Rovers, replacing Bruno Andrade in the 68th minute. On his second start for the Cards, Daniel scored his first goal in a 5–2 victory over Chester, netting a free-kick to give Woking a 3–0 lead into half-time. A week later, Daniel scored once again in a 1–1 draw against Boreham Wood.

After failing to impress under manager Garry Hill with Woking, he rarely featured and therefore joined National League rivals Welling United on a non-contract deal in January 2016. On 23 January 2016, Daniel made his Welling United in a 2–1 home defeat against Barrow, playing the full 90 minutes. A week later, Daniel scored his first Welling United goal in a 1–1 draw against FC Halifax Town. Daniel went on to score twice more in thirteen appearances for Welling before leaving at the end of the 2015–16 campaign.

After numerous trials for National League clubs including Boreham Wood, Daniel opted to join Isthmian League Premier Division side Dulwich Hamlet in August 2016. On 13 August 2016, Daniel made his Dulwich Hamlet debut in a 2–2 draw against AFC Sudbury, scoring in the 40th minute.

On 28 October 2016, Daniel joined Leatherhead on loan from Dulwich Hamlet. On 5 November 2016, Daniel made his Leatherhead debut in their 3–1 home victory against Lowestoft Town, featuring for the entire 90 minutes. A couple of weeks later, Daniel scored twice in Leatherhead's 5–2 victory over Staines Town. On 31 January 2017, it was announced that Daniel had been released from his contract with Dulwich Hamlet. Preceding his release from Dulwich, Daniel re-joined Leatherhead on a permanent deal.

Daniel joined Dover Athletic on 1 August 2017, after a trial period with the club in which he scored in a 3–0 victory at Deal Town. He made his debut, coming off the bench on the opening day of the season in a 1–0 away victory to Hartlepool United. He scored his first goal for the club in a 2–0 away victory to Aldershot Town where he won the ball on the halfway line ran down the wing before beating Nick Arnold and firing across goal into the far corner past Jake Cole to make it 2–0. The win sent Dover to the top of the National League for the first time in their history.

Daniel signed a new contract with Dover at the end of the season following 2 goals in 39 appearances, but was not a regular in the 2018–19 season, spending time on loan at Isthmian League club Margate. Daniel was released at the end of the season and rejoined Margate.

Proceeding a season back with Margate on a permanent basis, in which he netted twelve times in thirty-five appearances, Daniel joined fellow Isthmian League side, Kingstonian ahead of the 2020–21 campaign.

On 25 May 2021, it was announced that Daniel would join National League South side, Hampton & Richmond Borough.

On 30 November 2021, Daniel returned to Hayes & Yeading United, a club in which he had previously enjoyed a loan spell during the 2014–15 campaign.

On 22 June 2022, Daniel joined Folkestone Invicta for the upcoming season.

Daniel joined Horsham in February 2023. He scored a first half hat-trick in a 4-1 Isthmian League Premier Division win away to Kingstonian.

International career
In May 2015, Daniel received his first call-up for the Guyana U23 squad. Daniel went on to feature numerous times for Guyana U23, before receiving a call-up to the senior squad within the same year. On 25 June 2015, Daniel made his Guyana debut in a 2–0 defeat against Cuba. Daniel made a further appearance in November 2017, whilst at Dover, featuring for the full 90 minutes during Guyana's friendly against Trinidad and Tobago, which resulted in a 1–1 draw. He played in three of the four qualifying matches that took Guyana through to the CONCACAF Gold Cup for the first time in the nation's history, and played in one group match, a draw with Trinidad & Tobago, at the tournament itself.

Career statistics

Club

International
Scores and results list Guyana's goal tally first, score column indicates score after each Daniel goal.

References

1994 births
Living people
Footballers from Lambeth
Guyanese footballers
Guyana international footballers
English footballers
Association football wingers
Crystal Palace F.C. players
Charlton Athletic F.C. players
Hayes & Yeading United F.C. players
Torquay United F.C. players
Woking F.C. players
Welling United F.C. players
Dulwich Hamlet F.C. players
Leatherhead F.C. players
Dover Athletic F.C. players
Margate F.C. players
Kingstonian F.C. players
Hampton & Richmond Borough F.C. players
Folkestone Invicta F.C. players
National League (English football) players
Isthmian League players
2019 CONCACAF Gold Cup players
English people of Guyanese descent